Star Street is a Dutch-American animated series that aired between 1989 and 1990 internationally and 1991-1992 in the Netherlands.
The series was popular both in Benelux and in the United Kingdom. 
The protagonists were pink big-nosed creatures comically fashioned after horoscopes of the western zodiac and was set on a small star-shaped planet in the outer reaches of the universe. The antagonists were green blobbish creatures known appropriately as blobs governed by an even larger pink blob creature, Momo the Glutton. 
The cartoon's premise is somewhat similar to The Smurfs and The Care Bears.  
Studio 100 is the company that currently owns the rights to the show.

Characters

Protagonists
Ari (Aries) (voiced by Bob Ridgley): An inventor.
Flip (Aquarius) (voiced by Patrick Pinney): A swimmer and the village idiot of the series. 
Leo (Leo): Brave and fearless, but talks a lot.
Sagi (Sagittarius) (voiced by Charlie Adler): Best friends with Scorpio.
Bubbles (Pisces) (voiced by Sherry Lynn): An artist who loves nature.
Moon (Cancer) (voiced by Charlie Adler and Allison Argo) : The village cook. Her voice sometimes resembles that of Julia Child.
Cap (Capricorn): Sincere and wise. He works with computers much like Ari and has a near encyclopedic knowledge thanks to his portable computer.
Scorpio (Scorpio) (voiced by Charlie Adler): Best friends with Sagi.
Torro (Taurus) (voiced by Patrick Pinney): Friendly.
Virgy (Virgo) (voiced by Sherry Lynn): She truly cares for her friends, but is rather vain. She is convinced that she can sing, but her singing voice often causes trouble in Star Street.
Libby (Libra): The unofficial leader of the village. 
Gemo and Gemi (Gemini) (voiced by Charlie Adler and Sherry Lynn): Two mischievous twins.
The Great One (voiced by Gregg Berger): A genie-like being who lives in a cave behind the waterfall by the star kids' village. He acts as a father figure, giving advice and aiding the star kids. He is also the guardian of the magic wishing belt.
Graybeard (voiced by Bob Ridgley): Star Street's version of the Sandman, giving people good dreams by sprinkling stardust on them while they sleep.

Antagonists
Blub Blubs: Green blob creatures who communicate by saying their name. They work for Momo the Glutton.
Momo the Glutton: An enormous pink blob-like creature that lives in the Junk Planet close to Star Street. He makes the Blub Blubs who live there look for food and feed him. When he goes too long without eating, he shrinks.

External links
 Official website via The Wayback Machine

Channel 4 original programming
Dutch children's animated comedy television series
Dutch children's animated fantasy television series
ITV children's television shows
1980s Dutch television series
1990s Dutch television series
1989 Dutch television series debuts
1990 Dutch television series endings